Young Cove is a bay in the U.S. state of Washington.

Young Cove has the name of Volney Young,  a local boat captain.

References

Landforms of Thurston County, Washington
Bays of Washington (state)